Edward Butler (1862–1940) was an English inventor who produced an early three-wheeled petrol automobile called the Butler Petrol Cycle, which is accepted by many as the first British car.

Butler showed plans for his three-wheeled petrol vehicle at the Stanley Cycle Show in London in 1884, two years earlier than Karl Benz, who is generally recognized as the inventor of the modern automobile. Butler's vehicle was also the first design to be shown at the 1885 Inventions Exhibition, also in London.

Butler Petrol Cycle

Built by the Merryweather Fire Engine company in Greenwich, in 1888, the Butler Petrol Cycle (first recorded use of the term) was a three-wheeled petrol vehicle. The rear wheel was directly driven by a 5/8hp (466W) 600 cc (40 in3; 2¼×5-inch {57×127-mm}) flat twin four-stroke engine (with magneto ignition replaced by coil and battery), equipped with rotary valves and a float-fed carburettor (five years before Maybach), and Ackermann steering, all of which were state of the art at the time. The engine was liquid-cooled, with a radiator over the rear driving wheel. Speed was controlled by means of a throttle valve lever. The driver was seated between the front wheels.

Additionally, the vehicle had to be attended by three people, one of whom had to proceed in front of the vehicle waving a red flag.

Butler wrote in the magazine The English Mechanic in 1890, "The authorities do not countenance its use on the roads, and I have abandoned in consequence any further development of it."

Due to general lack of interest, Butler broke up his machine for scrap in 1896, and sold the patent rights to Harry J. Lawson who continued manufacture of the engine for use in motorboats.

Instead, Butler turned to making stationary and marine engines. His motor tricycle was in advance of its better-known contemporaries on several points.

See also
 List of car manufacturers of the United Kingdom
 List of motorcycles of the 1890s

References

Other sources
 
G.N. Georgano Cars: Early and Vintage 1886–1930. London: Grange-Universal, 1990 (reprints AB Nordbok 1985 edition). .

External links

 Butler Petrol Cycle at 3wheelers.com

1862 births
1940 deaths
English mechanical engineers
People associated with the internal combustion engine
British automobile designers